Arambagh Krira Sangha is a Bangladeshi sports club based in Dhaka, that competes in the Dhaka Senior Division Football League, the third-tier of football in Bangladesh.

History
Arambagh Krira Sangha were formed in Dhaka way back in 1958. Originally established as a football club, Arambagh later added handball, basketball and volleyball in their roster.

However, they became the first club from Bangladesh who played in final in an international club tournament during 1981 ANFA Cup, hosted by Nepal. They also finished runners-up twice in the Sikkim Gold Cup. In 1997, the club took part in a football tournament at Agartala that marked the golden jubilee of the independence of India. They used to be a top-five finisher prior to 1990, but failed to continue their form later and during 2012–13 season, the club experienced one of its lowest points when it was relegated from the Bangladesh Football Premier League. Since their return to the top flight again in 2016, their performance graph only shows upward movement.

Moreover, after being appointed as the club president in 2015, Mominul Haque Shaeed made a link-up with Dilkusha and Arambagh Football Academy to collect footballers from grassroots for his club, and those players are now delivering results.

As far as domestic football is concerned, Arambagh emerged as the runners-up three times in the prestigious season-opening Bangladesh Federation Cup, in 1997, 2001 and 2016.
International or domestic football, Arambagh's crowning moment came in the 2017–18 Independence Cup where they defeated established powerhouses on their way to the title.

Saiful Bari Titu era
Arambagh KS appointed Saiful Bari Titu as head coach on 19 March 2016.

Arambagh finished at sixth position in 2016 Bangladesh Football Premier League which is their best performance after 2009–10 Bangladesh League. They also played the final of Bangladesh Federation Cup after 15 long years where they lost the game to Dhaka Abahani by Lee Tuck's solitary goal.

Maruful Haque era
On 8 April 2017, Arambagh KS appointed former Bangladesh national football team head coach Maruful Haque as their new head coach.A few days later Arambagh also became the first club ever to introduce GPS system in Bangladesh football.

On 10 February 2018, Arambagh KS celebrated their first ever domestic silverware in the club's history of about 60 years by defeating defending champion Chittagong Abahani in the final of 2017–18 Independence Cup by 2–0 margin at Bangabandhu National Stadium in Dhaka.
The champions received taka 500,000 and the runners-up received taka 300,000 as prize money. Besides, Arambagh club management also announced taka 10,00,000 for the entire team.
Arambagh defender Arif was named the man of the final and also the man of the tournament. Arambagh striker Mohammad Jewel was adjudged the top scorer netting three goals.

Subrata Bhattacharya Jr.
On 23 December 2020, Arambagh boys gifted their new Indian head coach Subrata Bhattacharya a winning debut as they beat Brothers Union by 2–0.

On 16 August 2021 defeat against Uttar Baridhara SC at Dhaka the club have confirmed relegation from Bangladesh Premier League to Bangladesh Championship League. Its the club 2nd relegation after 2015–16 season.

Suspension and relegation
On 29 August 2021 Bangladesh Football Federation disciplinary committee had confirmed the clubs involvement with spot fixing, match manipulations and live and online betting. The clubs management committee along with local and foreign players, were all reported to be involved. BFF disciplinary committee decided to fine 5 lakhs BDT & ban the club for two years from entering the Bangladesh Championship League. The club would have to enter domestic football again through the third-tier, the Dhaka Senior Division Football League.

Current squad

Team records

Head Coach's record

Honours

Domestic
 Independence Cup
Champions (1): 2017–18

International
Sikkim Governor's Gold Cup
Runners-up (2): 2001, 2002
ANFA Cup
Runners-up (1): 1981

References

Sport in Dhaka
Association football clubs established in 1958
Football clubs in Bangladesh
1958 establishments in East Pakistan